Sye is a 2005 Indian Kannada-language action film directed by Arun Prasad P.A. featuring Sudeep and Kanika in the lead roles. The film features background score and soundtrack composed by Gurukiran and lyrics by Kaviraj and V. Manohar. The film released on 1 July 2005. This film is remake of Tamil movie Dhill.

Synopsis
The film's hero Chakri (Sudeep) harbors a strong ambition to become a police officer and even prepares for the test in right earnest. He has a strong family bond and is ably encouraged by all the family members who want him to be a police official. Chakri falls in love with Kannika who also becomes closer to his family members and friends. The right chord of harmony in Chakri's family is threatened when a highly corrupt and cruel police officer Mosale combats and provokes the hero. Chakri faces his first test when he has to deal with Mosale who wants to give as much trouble to him as possible.
Finally Chakri combats Mosale and even disfigures his face. Mosale wants to take revenge on Chakri and works out plans to see that the hero does not come out successful in the police entrance examinations. How Chakri comes out of the web created by Mosale and how he finally gets the job forms the rest of the story.

Cast

 Sudeep  as  Chakri
 Kanika  as Renuka/Renu
 Srinath as  Chakri's father
 Sumithra as   Chakri's mother
 Pasupathy  as  Inspector Mosale
 Avinash 
 Rajesh  as Arjun
 Mandya Ramesh as S.M.Krishna
 Bullet Prakash 
 Balraj 
 Umesh 
 Mandeep Roy

Music

Music composed by Gurukiran. The music released by Anand Audio.

Reception
A critic from Sify opined that "This film has all commercial ingredients like dance, action, songs and sentiments. Sudeep has done his part convincingly along with Pashupathi, as inspector Musale, has performed well". Critic R. G. Vijayasarathy said that "Despite having talented artists like Sudeep, Pashupathi and many proven artists, Arun Prasad makes a mess of his job. He has also failed to extract the best work from technicians also".

References

External links
 
webindia review
mymazaa review

2005 films
2000s Kannada-language films
Films scored by Gurukiran
Kannada remakes of Tamil films
Indian action films
Films directed by P. A. Arun Prasad
2005 action films